Robert Terrance Dawson (born December 4, 1963 in Windsor, Ontario) is a retired male wrestler from Canada.

Dawson represented Canada at the 1992 Summer Olympics in Barcelona, Spain, and twice won a silver medal at the Pan American Games during his career. He won a gold medal at the 1994 Commonwealth Games.

References
 sports-reference

1963 births
Living people
Commonwealth Games gold medallists for Canada
Olympic wrestlers of Canada
Sportspeople from Windsor, Ontario
Wrestlers at the 1992 Summer Olympics
Canadian male sport wrestlers
Wrestlers at the 1994 Commonwealth Games
Wrestling people from Ontario
Pan American Games silver medalists for Canada
Pan American Games bronze medalists for Canada
Commonwealth Games medallists in wrestling
Pan American Games medalists in wrestling
Wrestlers at the 1987 Pan American Games
Wrestlers at the 1991 Pan American Games
Wrestlers at the 1995 Pan American Games
Medalists at the 1987 Pan American Games
Medalists at the 1991 Pan American Games
Medalists at the 1995 Pan American Games
21st-century Canadian people
20th-century Canadian people
Medallists at the 1994 Commonwealth Games